The 2015 Korean Basketball League rookie draft (Korean: 2015 KBL 국내신인선수 드래프트) was held on October 26, 2017, at the Jamsil Students' Gymnasium in Seoul, South Korea. Out of the 34 participants, 22 players were drafted.

In September, the KBL released the list of participants. On October 26, the draft day itself, a try-out was held in the morning and the picks took place in the evening. Goyang Orion Orions traded its highest-drawn first round pick to Changwon LG Sakers in exchange for Moon Tae-jong, hence LG being able to obtain two first round picks.

Draft selections
This table only shows the first twenty picks.

Players
Future MVP Song Kyo-chang was the only high school senior picked in the draft. The third overall pick, he was the first high school senior to be picked so early in the history of the KBL draft since Korean-American Han Sang-woong (Richard Han) in 2005.

Notes

See also
Korean Basketball League draft

References

External links
 Draft: 2015 KBL Domestic Player draft results / 드래프트: 2015 KBL 국내신인선수 드래프트 결과 — Korean Basketball League official website 

Korean Basketball League draft
Korean Basketball League draft
2010s in Seoul
Korean Basketball League draft
Sport in Seoul
Events in Seoul